The Immaculate Conception Parish Church (Filipino: Simbahan ng Parokya ng Immaculada Concepcion) is the oldest Roman Catholic church in the municipality of Los Baños, Laguna, Philippines. Its titular is the Nuestra Señora del Aguas Santas (also Immaculate Conception) and its feast is celebrated every December 8.

History 
The town of Los Baños started as a visita of Bay under the Augustinian order with St. Nicolas de Tolentino as titular.  In 1590, Franciscans replaced the Augustinians in their missions with Fray Pedro Bautista, later canonized as San Pedro Bautista. He discovered numerous hot springs in the area which locals called Maynit. He created a public bath he called the “Los Baños". After twenty years, the Franciscans established a temporary convent to administer the hot springs that were popular for healing illnesses. A small hospital chapel was built in 1613 in the absence of a church until 1727 dedicated to the Our Lady of Immaculate Conception, with the title Aguas Santas. It was brought down by fire in 1727. A temporary chapel was built out of nipa and cane which was later destroyed again by fire. A big stone church was built in 1790 by Father Domingo Mateo, OFM in its present site. The belfry, sacristy and tile roofing were supervised by Father Manuel Amat in 1851 and the convent in 1852. The convent and bell tower were destroyed during the 1863 earthquake but repairs were made during the administration of Fathers Manuel Rodriguez and Gilberto Martin in 1880. It was also used in World War II as headquarters for the Japanese forces where it was used as a garrison by the Japanese during World War II.

Devotion 
The local image of the Virgin Mary under the titular of the Immaculate Conception is known as the Nuestra Señora del Aguas Santas (also Virgin of the Holy Waters). The image of Immaculate Concepcion was said to be miraculous. Some of the miracles includes the wetting of the Virgin’s robes up to the shoulders, amor seco growing from the hems of her garments and mysterious footprints all over the church leading to her altar. Due to the popular devotion to the Virgin and miracles attributed to her, the church is currently petitioning to become a diocesan shrine.

Notes

Bibliography

External links

Los Baños, Laguna
Los Baños, Laguna
Los Baños, Laguna
Los Baños, Laguna
Churches in the Roman Catholic Diocese of San Pablo